Crooks in Cloisters is a 1964 British comedy film directed by Jeremy Summers and starring Ronald Fraser as 'Little Walter', the leader of a gang of forgers, including Barbara Windsor as 'Bikini', Bernard Cribbins as 'Squirts', Melvyn Hayes as 'Willy', Grégoire Aslan as 'Lorenzo', and Davy Kaye as 'Specs'.

Plot 
After pulling off a train robbery by tricking the train into stopping with false signal lights, 'Little Walter' and his gang are forced to hide out on a remote Cornish island in a monastery (which they buy with their "ill-gotten gains"), disguised as monks. With them comes 'Bikini', Walter's girlfriend, who is given the job of cook to the group, despite never having cooked in her life. After a few initial setbacks, they slowly adjust to their new contemplative life of tending animals and crops, surviving the added tribulations of visits by a group of tourists and two of the real monks who had been forced to sell the monastery after falling on hard times, including Brother Lucius.

Gradually, the gang adjusts to its new pastoral life, which turns out to be much to their liking. A return to a life in the city is less appealing by the day. With the help of Phineas, a fisherman, they continue to receive and dispose of stolen goods. The crooks change and are kinder and gentler, but 'Brother' Squirts begins to place bets on the dogs and the police become suspicious. When Walter decides it is safe to leave, none of them want to go, including Willy, who has fallen for June, Phineas's granddaughter; these two manage to get away safely together. Walter gives the deeds of the island to the real monks who had originally owned it, and just as the rest of the gang say goodbye, they see the police waiting for them.

Cast
 Ronald Fraser as Little Walter (Walt) 
 Barbara Windsor as Bikini 
 Grégoire Aslan as  Lorenzo 
 Bernard Cribbins as Squirts 
 Davy Kaye as Specs 
 Wilfrid Brambell as Phineas 
 Melvyn Hayes as Willy 
 Joseph O'Conor as Father Septimus 
 Corin Redgrave as Brother Lucius 
 Francesca Annis as June 
 Norman Chappell as Benson 
 Arnold Ridley as Newsagent 
 Patricia Laffan as Lady Florence 
 Alister Williamson as Mungo 
 Russell Waters as Ship's Chandler 
 Howard Douglas as Publican 
 Max Bacon as Bookmaker

Production

Crooks in Cloisters was filmed at the Associated British Picture Studios at Borehamwood in Hertfordshire, and at St Mawes in Cornwall.
The harbour is Portloe. The opening train robbery sequence involves British Rail class 4 diesel locomotive D140 (later to become class 46 under TOPS) at an as-yet unidentified location. The exteriors sequences for the monastery were filmed around the grounds of Ashridge House in Ashridge near Berkhamstead in Hertfordshire.

References

External links 

Crooks in Cloisters synopsis
Crooks in Cloisters on the BFI website

1964 films
1964 comedy films
British crime comedy films
Films shot at Associated British Studios
1960s English-language films
Films directed by Jeremy Summers
Films set in Cornwall
1960s British films
1960s crime comedy films